Barin Ghosh (5 June 1952 – 7 October 2015) was an Indian Judge and former Chief Justice of three High Courts of India.

Career
Ghosh was born in 1952. After passing B.Com., LL.B. he was enrolled as an Advocate on 19 December 1978 and practiced in the Calcutta High Court. He worked on Civil, Company and Constitutional matters. On 14 July 1995 he was appointed a Permanent Judge of the Calcutta High Court. Justice Ghosh was transferred to Patna High Court on 7 January 2005. He became the Chief Justice of Jammu and Kashmir High Court on 31 January 2009. Thereafter Justice Ghosh was also appointed the Chief Justice of the Sikkim High Court on 13 April 2010. He was transferred to the Uttarakhand High Court on 6 August 2010 and served there as a Chief Justice. Ghosh died in Kolkata on 7 October 2015.

References

1952 births
2015 deaths
Indian judges
Chief Justices of the Jammu and Kashmir High Court
Chief Justices of the Sikkim High Court
Chief Justices of the Uttarakhand High Court
Judges of the Calcutta High Court
Judges of the Patna High Court
20th-century Indian judges
20th-century Indian lawyers
Bengali people